Sphodromantis giubana is a species of praying mantis found in Somalia.

See also
African mantis
List of mantis genera and species

References

G
Mantodea of Africa
Insects of Somalia
Insects described in 1987